Unplugged is a 1992 live album by Eric Clapton, recorded at Bray Studios, England in front of an audience for the MTV Unplugged television series. It includes a version of the successful 1992 single "Tears in Heaven" and an acoustic version of "Layla". The album itself won three Grammy awards at the 35th Annual Grammy Awards in 1993 and became the bestselling live album of all time, and Clapton's bestselling album, selling 26 million copies worldwide.

Recording
Clapton performed the show in front of a small audience on 16 January 1992 at Bray Film Studios in Windsor, England. In addition to the final album tracks, the performance included early versions of "My Father's Eyes" and "Circus Left Town" along with "Worried Life Blues" and a version of "Rollin' and Tumblin'".

Shortly after telling the studio audience "that's it," Clapton said they needed to do "two – no, three - no, five" songs over again, adding "if you don't mind, I don't mind." After the second take of "My Father's Eyes" there was a brief break and cameras were off. Clapton broke into an impromptu "Rollin' and Tumblin'", which he had last performed with Cream. The seasoned musicians quickly picked up on it and the crowd clapped along. The director signaled the crew to record, which is why there is such an abrupt start to the song mid-verse. Clapton was so pleased with it that when the song ended, he asked the director, "did you get that?"

For much of the performance, Clapton played Martin 000-42 acoustic guitars. In 2004, one of the guitars sold for $791,500 (£434,400) at auction.

Critical reception

The album was released on 25 August 1992 to some of the best reviews of his career. The album renewed the public's interest in Clapton, and boosted his popularity. Critical reception has been mixed though muted; in general, reviewers report that the album, if unremarkable, is "relaxed" and "pleasant". Stephen Thomas Erlewine for AllMusic feels that people have misrepresented and mythologised the album; that though it came after Paul McCartney's MTV Unplugged album, Unplugged (The Official Bootleg) (1991), people often mistake it for "the first-ever MTV album", that they often feel that "it alone was responsible for revitalizing Clapton's career", and that "Tears in Heaven" was first recorded here. Erlewine feels that the songs are "lively and relaxed", that Clapton turns "Layla" from an "anguished howl of pain into a cozy shuffle and the whole album proceeds at a similar amiable gait" while "Clapton is embracing his middle age". Robert Christgau was sharper in his comments, feeling that in an effort to be inoffensive "Clapton-the-electric-guitarist" has been relegated "to the mists of memory", and that "Layla" was turned into a "whispery greeting card".

Greg Kot of the Chicago Tribune calls the release a "blues album for yuppies" and rates it with 2.5 of 4 stars, saying it is between fair and good. Entertainment Weekly journalist Steve Simels scores the album an A− calling the album "a charmer, a collection of blues standards and recent Clapton songs rendered with just the right combination of intensity (a deeply felt version of "Tears in Heaven") and giddy fun (Clapton actually plays kazoo on "San Francisco Bay Blues")". Steve Hochman in the Los Angeles Times felt that "Tears in Heaven" was "maudlin but moving", "Layla" was "low-key but seductive", but the blues numbers performed in an intimate setting makes the album "Clapton's most passionate collection in years". Commenting on the popularity of the album in his 2007 autobiography, Clapton wishes the reader to understand the great emotional toll he experienced around that time, and suggests that they visit the grave of his son Conor in Ripley to do so. It was voted number 788 in the third edition of Colin Larkin's All Time Top 1000 Albums (2000).

Accolades
Clapton was nominated for nine Grammy Awards at the 35th Annual Grammy Awards in 1993 and won six, including Record of the Year, Album of the Year, Song of the Year, Best Pop Vocal Performance - Male, Best Rock Vocal Performance – Male, and Best Rock Song. Although "Tears in Heaven" also earned three Grammy Awards, it was the version from Rush that the judges awarded.

Personnel

 Eric Clapton – lead vocals, acoustic guitar, dobro, kazoo
 Andy Fairweather Low – acoustic guitar, mandolin, harmonica
 Chuck Leavell – acoustic piano, harmonium
 Nathan East – acoustic bass, backing vocals
 Steve Ferrone – drums, percussion
 Ray Cooper – percussion
 Katie Kissoon – backing vocals
 Tessa Niles – backing vocals

Production

Studio Credits 
 Russ Titelman – producer
 James "Jimbo" Barton – recording engineer
 Steve Boyer – mixing at The Power Station (New York, NY).
 Victor Deygilo – mix assistant 
 Ted Jensen – mastering at Sterling Sound (New York, NY).
 Bill Smith Studio – sleeve design

Live Credits
 Milton Lage – film director
 Alex Coletti – producer for MTV.
 Joel Gallen – executive producer for MTV.
 Mick Double – production manager, stage manager 
 Tom Kenny – lighting operator
 Wil Roberts – head electrician engineer 
 Buford Jones – sound engineer 
 John Roden – monitor engineer
 Doug Hall – sound technician
 Lee Dickson – guitar technician for Eric Clapton.
 Tom Calcaterra – guitar technician 
 Alan Rogan – guitar technician 
 Tim Myer – keyboard technician
 John Collins – drum technician

Commercial performance
In Germany the album peaked at No. 3 in the German Albums Chart and sold a total of 1.25 million copies, becoming one of the best-selling albums in Germany. In Austria, Unplugged held itself 46 weeks in the Austrian Albums Chart and sold more than 100,000 copies in total. In Switzerland the album also reached No. 3 in the country's chart. Selling 60,000 copies in the first two weeks, the live album was certified silver by the British Phonographic Industry – a record for any British artist. In the U.S. the album peaked at No. 1.

Re-release
On 15 October 2013 the album and concert DVD were re-released, titled Unplugged: Expanded & Remastered. The album includes the original 14 tracks, remastered, as well as a bonus disc with six additional tracks, including two versions of "My Father's Eyes". The DVD includes a restored version of the concert, as well as over 60 minutes of unseen footage from the rehearsal.

Track listing

Notes:
signifies arranged by

Single releases
The acoustic rework of "Layla" was released as the single "Layla (Acoustic)", sometimes titled as "Layla (Unplugged)" in September 1992. The release reached top positions in both 1992 and 1993, reaching No. 1 in the RPM Canadian Top Singles chart as well as peaking at No. 4 in the Canadian Adult Contemporary Tracks the same year. It also became popular in the US reaching No. 4 on the Billboard Pop Singles chart, peaking at No. 9 in the Mainstream Rock chart and reaching place 12 on the Billboard Hot 100. It also reached the top ten five of other countries.

"Running on Faith" was not released as a single, but reached No. 15 on the Billboard Mainstream rock chart in 1993 as well as No. 28 on the Adult Contemporary chart which are based on radio airplay. "Tears in Heaven" was not released as a single from Unplugged, but from the soundtrack for the film Rush.

Chart positions

Weekly charts

Year-end charts

Certifications

Album

VHS and DVD

See also 
List of best-selling albums
List of best-selling albums in Argentina
List of best-selling albums in Brazil
List of best-selling albums in Germany
List of best-selling albums in Ireland
List of best-selling albums in the United States

References

External links
 

Eric Clapton live albums
Grammy Award for Album of the Year
Unplugged (Clapton, Eric album)
Albums produced by Russ Titelman
1992 live albums
Reprise Records live albums
Warner Records video albums
Grammy Award for Best Male Rock Vocal Performance